Abbeydorney GAA Club is a Gaelic Athletic Association is an Irish hurling club from North County Kerry near Tralee, Ireland.

History

Abbeydorney are one of the oldest clubs in Kerry. The club was founded in 1885. They have won Senior County Championships in 1893, 1895, 1913, 1974.  The official opening of the Abbeydorney GAA Club sportsfield took place on 15 May 1977 were Kerry played Galway in Hurling and Austin Stacks played Caltra in Football. In 2009 the club hosted the first Hurling game in Kerry to be played under lights in a North Kerry League game with Ballyheigue.

Championships won

 Kerry Senior Hurling Championship (4) 1893, 1895, 1913, 1974
 Kerry County Senior Hurling League Division 1 (1) 2022
 Kerry Minor Hurling Championship (7) 1954, 1956, 1957, 1971, 1999, 2008, 2018
 Kerry Under-21 hurling championship (1) with Crotta O'Neill's 2012
 Kerry Junior Hurling Championship (7) 1938, 1947, 1951, 1994, 2000, 2001, 2002
 North Kerry Senior Hurling Championship (6) 1926, 1928, 1929, 1935, 1936, 1968

External links
 Official website

Gaelic games clubs in County Kerry
Hurling clubs in County Kerry